P. bucephala may refer to:

 Phalera bucephala, the buff-tip, a moth species found throughout Europe
 Phylliroe bucephala, a synonym for Phylliroe bucephalum, a species of pelagic parasitic nudibranch

See also
 Bucephala (disambiguation)